Marline Barberena (born May 24, 1987, in Miami) is a Nicaraguan-American beauty pageant titleholder who was crowned Miss Nicaragua 2014 and represented Nicaragua at Miss Universe 2014.

Early life
Marline was raised in the Little Havana sector of Miami.  She later moved to Fort Lauderdale, Florida. Marline holds an associate degree in Business Administration. Marline worked for Apple before pursuing her dream of beauty pageants.

Pageantry

Miss Nicaragua 2014
Marline represented Chichigalpa at Miss Nicaragua 2014 where she was crowned as the winner, gaining the right to represent Nicaragua in the Miss Universe 2014 pageant. At the same time, the runners-up competed at Miss International 2014 and Miss Supranational 2014. She is the fourth winner to be born and raised outside of Nicaragua after her predecessor Nastassja Bolívar, who was also born and raised primarily in Miami.

Nuestra Belleza Latina 2013
Marline competed at Nuestra Belleza Latina 2013 and placed in the Top 24.

Miss Universe 2014
Marline represented Nicaragua at Miss Universe 2014.

References

External links
Official Miss Nicaragua website

1987 births
Living people
Nicaraguan beauty pageant winners
People from Miami
Female models from Florida
American people of Nicaraguan descent
Miss Universe 2014 contestants
21st-century American women